The 2016–17 Syrian Premier League season is the 46th since its establishment. This season's league featured one stage. It pitted one group of 16 teams and kicked off on 23 December 2016.
Al-Jaish are the defending champions, having won the previous season championship.

Teams

Stadiums and locations

League table

Standings

Season statistics

Top goalscorers

 Source:

References 

Syrian Premier League seasons
1
Syria